Taiaroa may refer to:

Places 
 Taiaroa Head,  New Zealand

People with the surname 
 Archie Taiaroa (1937–2010), prominent New Zealand Māori
 Dick Taiaroa (c. 1866–1954), New Zealand rugby union player
 Hōri Kerei Taiaroa (c. 1835–1905), New Zealand politician and Māori leader
 John Taiaroa (1862–1907), New Zealand sportsman
 Te Mātenga Taiaroa (c. 1795–1863), New Zealand Māori leader
 Tini Kerei Taiaroa, (1846–1934), New Zealand community worker

Other 
 SS Taiaroa, a steamship built in 1875 that operated in New Zealand
 HMS Taiaroa (1883), a torpedo boat assigned to the defense of Port Chalmers, New Zealand
 Taiaroa (coral), a genus of corals